The discography of Argyle Goolsby, an American horror punk musician, consists of two studio albums, one compilation album, two extended plays (EPs), and four music videos. After the disestablishment of Blitzkid in 2012, Goolsby started his solo career and toured under the band names Argyle Goolsby and the Roving Midnight and Argyle Goolsby and the Hollow Bodies.  He released his debut album Darken Your Doorstep in 2017, which featured various members from bands Goolsby routinely toured with. His second full length studio album Hollow Bodies was released on 21 August 2018.

Albums

Studio albums

Compilations

Extended plays

Splits

Singles

Music videos

Other appearances

Non-album appearances

With Blitzkid

With Dr. Chud's X-Ward

With Mister Monster

With 1476

With Silent Horror

Featured compilations

Various appearances

See also
Blitzkid Discography

Footnotes

References

External links
 Argyle Goolsby's official website
 A Corpse With No Name Productions
 Blitzkid's official website

Punk rock group discographies
Discographies of American artists